Abantiades is a genus of moths of the family Hepialidae. There are 14 described species, all found exclusively in Australia. The group includes some large species with a wingspan of up to 160 mm. The larvae feed on the roots of Eucalyptus and other trees.

The Pindi moth (A. latipennis) is an abundant species of the eucalypt forests of Tasmania and, unlike many invertebrate species, appears to adapt well to the controversial forestry practice of clearfelling.

Species 
Abantiades includes the following species:
 Abantiades albofasciatus
 Abantiades aphenges
 Abantiades aurilegulus
 Abantiades barcas
 Abantiades fulvomarginatus
 Abantiades hyalinatus (southern Queensland to Tasmania)
 Abantiades hydrographus
 Abantiades labyrinthicus (east coast, southern Queensland to Tasmania)
 Abantiades latipennis - Pindi moth (Victoria and Tasmania)
 Abantiades leucochiton
 Abantiades magnificus (eastern Victoria and New South Wales)
 Abantiades marcidus
 Abantiades ocellatus
 Abantiades sericatus

References

External links
Biodiversity impacts and sustainability implications of clearfell logging in the Weld Valley, Tasmania

Hepialidae
Exoporia genera
Taxa named by Gottlieb August Wilhelm Herrich-Schäffer
Moth genera